Stochastic cellular automata or probabilistic cellular automata (PCA) or random cellular automata or locally interacting Markov chains are an important extension of cellular automaton. Cellular automata are a discrete-time dynamical system of interacting entities, whose state is discrete.

The state of the collection of entities is updated at each discrete time according to some simple homogeneous rule. All entities' states are updated in parallel or synchronously. Stochastic Cellular Automata are CA whose updating rule is a stochastic one, which means the new entities' states are chosen according to some probability distributions. It is a discrete-time random dynamical system. From the spatial interaction between the entities, despite the simplicity of the updating rules, complex behaviour may emerge like self-organization. As mathematical object, it may be considered in the framework of stochastic processes as an interacting particle system in discrete-time.
See 
for a more detailed introduction.

PCA as Markov stochastic processes 

As discrete-time Markov process, PCA are defined on a product space  (cartesian product) where 
is a finite or infinite graph, like  and where  is a finite space, like for instance
The transition probability has a product form
 where
In general some locality is required  where
  with  a finite neighbourhood of k. See  for a more detailed introduction following the probability theory's point of view.

Examples of stochastic cellular automaton

Majority cellular automaton 

There is a version of the majority cellular automaton with probabilistic updating rules. See the Toom's rule.

Relation to lattice random fields 
PCA may be used to simulate the Ising model of ferromagnetism in statistical mechanics.
Some categories of models were studied from a statistical mechanics point of view.

Cellular Potts model 
There is a strong connection
between probabilistic cellular automata and the cellular Potts model in particular when it is implemented in parallel.

Non Markovian generalization 
The Galves-Löcherbach model is an example of a generalized PCA with a non Markovian aspect.

References

Further reading
.
.
.
.
.
 
 

Cellular automata
Stochastic processes
Lattice models
Markov processes
Self-organization
Complex systems theory
Spatial processes
Stochastic models
Markov models